Thailand has competed at every celebration of the Asian Games, including hosting the Games in 1966, 1970, 1978 and 1998. Thai athletes have won a total of 109 gold medals (7th out of 37) and 463 overall medals (5th out of 43) at the Asian Games.

Asian Games

Medals by Games

Medals by sport

Asian Winter Games

Medals by Games

Medals by Sport

Asian Indoor and Martial Arts Games

Medals by Games

Medals by sport

Asian Beach Games

Medals by Games

Medals by sport

Asian Youth Games

Medals by Games

Medals by sport

See also

 Olympics
 Thailand at the Olympics
 Thailand at the Youth Olympics
 Paralympic
 Thailand at the Paralympics
 Asian Games
 Thailand at the Asian Para Games
 Other
 Thailand at the Southeast Asian Games
 Thailand at the Universiade
 Thailand at the World Games
Thailand at the Deaflympics

References